Sébastien Schneiter (born 24 September 1995) is a Swiss sailor. He and Lucien Cujean placed 13th in the 49er event at the 2016 Summer Olympics.

References

1995 births
Living people
Swiss male sailors (sport)
Olympic sailors of Switzerland
Sailors at the 2010 Summer Youth Olympics
Sailors at the 2016 Summer Olympics – 49er
Sailors at the 2020 Summer Olympics – 49er
21st-century Swiss people